Jerome Eli Sally (born February 24, 1959) is an American coach, educator, and former football player who played nose tackle for seven seasons for the New York Giants, the Indianapolis Colts, and the Kansas City Chiefs.

Early life and college career 
Sally played football at Proviso East High School and attended the University of Missouri from 1978 to 1981. He was a standout defensive lineman who helped anchor Tiger defenses that keyed Mizzou to four consecutive bowl games from 1978 to 1981, lettering three years (1979–1981). During that time, MU had a combined record of 23–13, including two bowl game victories. 

After retiring from football, Sally earned a Master of Education from William Woods University.

Career 
Sally played professionally with the New York Giants from 1982 to 1986, where he had 7 1/2 QB sacks in 1985 and eventually won a Super Bowl ring as part of the 1986 World Championship team. He also played in the NFL for the Indianapolis Colts and Kansas City Chiefs before his retirement in 1988.

After retiring from professional football, Sally worked as the defensive coordinator at Hickman High School from 1991 to 1996 and as the school's strength and fitness coach from 1991 to 2006.

He was elected to the University of Missouri Hall of Fame in 2006, and the Proviso East Sports Hall of Fame in 2014.

Since 2015, Sally has worked as an assistant principal at Hickman High School in Columbia, Missouri. In 2018, Sally sued Columbia Public Schools for alleged race and age discrimination, claiming that he had been paid less than his white colleagues.

References

1959 births
Living people
People from Columbia, Missouri
Players of American football from Chicago
American football defensive tackles
Missouri Tigers football players
New York Giants players
Indianapolis Colts players
Kansas City Chiefs players